This article lists the Mayors of Vesoul in chronological order from 1797 to today

List of mayors 
List of mayors.

References 
 Source  MairesGenWeb - Recensement des Maires de France à travers l'Histoire

Vesoul
Vesoul